Dorothea Elizabeth Orem (June 15, 1914 – June 22, 2007), born in Baltimore, Maryland, was a nursing theorist and creator of the self-care deficit nursing theory, also known as the Orem model of nursing.

Education
Orem received a nursing diploma from Providence Hospital School of Nursing in Washington, DC. She also attended Catholic University of America, earning a Bachelor of Science in Nursing Education in 1939 and a Master of Science in Nursing Education in 1945.

Orem has been awarded honorary doctoral degrees from Georgetown University, Incarnate Word College and Illinois Wesleyan University.

Self-care deficit nursing theory
Orem's nursing theory states self-care as a human need, and nurses design interventions to provide or manage self-care actions for persons to recover or maintain health.

Nursing diagnosis
Orem was a member of the group of nurse theorists who presented Patterns of Unitary Man (Humans), the initial framework for nursing diagnosis, to the North American Nursing Diagnosis Association in 1982.

Awards
1980: Alumni Achievement Award for Nursing Theory, Catholic University of America

Death
Orem died on June 22, 2007 in Savannah, Georgia, where she had spent the last 25 years of her life as a consultant and author. She was 92.

References

External links

Orem Society

1914 births
2007 deaths
American nurses
American women nurses
Nursing theorists
Self-care
People from Baltimore
Catholic University of America alumni
Nursing researchers
20th-century women scientists
20th-century American women
20th-century American people
21st-century American women